Łukasz Zjawiński (born 11 July 2001) is a Polish professional footballer who plays as a forward for Ekstraklasa side Widzew Łódź, on loan from Lechia Gdańsk.

Club career
Zjawiński started his career playing with the youth sides of his local team Iskra Pszczyna. He had spells in the youth sides of the largest teams in the area, Ruch Chorzów and Górnik Zabrze, before moving to Warsaw to join Legia Warsaw. After progressing his way through the Legia youth sides he started playing for the Legia Warsaw II team, making a total of 26 appearances and scoring 4 goals over two seasons.

During his time at Legia he also went on loan to II liga team Stal Stalowa Wola, where he made 16 appearances and scored one goal in his six month loan spell. For the 2020–21 season, Zjawiński joined newly promoted Ekstraklasa side Stal Mielec, making 24 appearances and scoring one goal in his first top flight season. 

After just one season with Stal, Zjawiński joined fellow Ekstraklasa side Lechia Gdańsk in July 2021. On 3 January 2022, Lechia had announced that an agreement in principle was reached with Sandecja Nowy Sącz for the loan of Zjawiński until the end of the season. On 17 August 2022, it was announced he would join another Ekstraklasa club Widzew Łódź on a one-year loan, with an option to buy.

References

2001 births
Living people
People from Pszczyna
Polish footballers
Poland youth international footballers
Association football forwards
Ekstraklasa players
I liga players
II liga players
III liga players
IV liga players
Legia Warsaw players
Legia Warsaw II players
Stal Stalowa Wola players
Stal Mielec players
Lechia Gdańsk players
Lechia Gdańsk II players
Sandecja Nowy Sącz players
Widzew Łódź players